E217 may refer to:
 E217 series, a suburban electric train type
 Sodium propyl para-hydroxybenzoate